Phengodes fusciceps is a species of glowworm beetle in the family Phengodidae. It is found in North America.

Subspecies
These four subspecies belong to the species Phengodes fusciceps:
 Phengodes fusciceps floridensis Blatchley, 1919
 Phengodes fusciceps fusciceps LeConte, 1861
 Phengodes fusciceps intermedia Wittmer, 1976
 Phengodes fusciceps picicollis Horn, 1891

References

Further reading

 
 

Phengodidae
Bioluminescent insects
Articles created by Qbugbot
Beetles described in 1861